Giovanni Arduino (16 October 1714 – 21 March 1795) was an  Italian geologist who is known as the "Father of Italian Geology".

Arduino was born at Caprino Veronese, Veneto. He was a mining specialist who developed possibly the first classification of geological time, based on study of the geology of northern Italy. He divided the history of the Earth into four periods: Primitive, Secondary, Tertiary, and Volcanic, or Quaternary.

The scheme proposed by Arduino in 1759, which was based on much study of rocks of the southern Alps, grouped the rocks into four series. These were (in addition to the Volcanic or Quaternary) as follows: the Primary series, which consisted of schists from the core of the mountains; the Secondary, which consisted of the hard sedimentary rocks on the mountain flanks; and the Tertiary, which consisted of the less hardened sedimentary rocks of the foothills. Because this arrangement did not always hold true for mountain ranges other than the Alps, the Primary and the Secondary were dropped in the general case. However the term 'Tertiary' has persisted in geological literature until its recent replacement by the Palaeogene and Neogene periods. The last period of the Cenozoic Era is still known as the Quaternary period. The Cenozoic was studied and further determined by, among others, the English geologist (and mentor of Charles Darwin) Charles Lyell.

Giovanni Arduino died in Venice in 1795. The lunar ridge Dorsum Arduino is named after him.

Further reading

References

External links 

 
Effetti di Antichissimi Estinti Vulcani, e Altri Fenomeni, e Prodotti Fossili Osservati da Giovanni Arduino (1769); Osservazioni chimiche sopra alcuni fossili (1779); and Esame Chimico, e Considerazioni Sopra la Marga, Ossia Marna... (1791)- full digital facsimiles at Linda Hall Library

1714 births
1795 deaths
People from the Province of Verona
18th-century Italian geologists